Patersonia limbata is a species of plant in the iris family Iridaceae and is endemic to the south of Western Australia. It is a tufted, rhizome-forming herb with sword-shaped, bordered leaves and violet tepals.

Description
Flowering occurs from September to October.

Taxonomy and naming
Patersonia limbata was first described in 1846 by Stephan Endlicher in Lehmann's Plantae Preissianae from specimens collected near Albany in 1840. The specific epithet (limbata) means "having a border".

Distribution and habitat
This patersonia grows in heath, scrub and woodland in scattered locations on the southern Darling Range and in near-coastal areas from Albany to the Cape Arid National Park.

Conservation status
Patersonia limbata is classified as "not threatened" by the Western Australian Government Department of Biodiversity, Conservation and Attractions.

References

limbata
Flora of Western Australia
Plants described in 1846
Taxa named by Stephan Endlicher